Shéhérazade is a 2018 French drama film directed by Jean-Bernard Marlin and written by Jean-Bernard Marlin and Catherine Paillé.

Cast 
  as Zachary
 Kenza Fortas as Shéhérazade
 Idir Azougli as Ryad
 Lisa Amedjout as Sabrina
 Kader Benchoudar as Medhi Mouton
 Nabila Ait Amer as Sara
 Nabila Bounad as Souraya
 Sofia Bent as Zelda (as Sofian Bentoumi)
 Osman Hrustic as Cheyenne
 Abdellah Khoulalene as Jordi
 Abdelkader Benkaddar as Jugurtha
 Agnès Cauchon Riondet as La juge (as Agnès Cauchon)
 Sabine Gavaudan as La juge d'instruction
 Assia Laouid as Assia

References

External links 
 
 

2018 films
2018 drama films
French drama films
Hood films
2010s French-language films
2010s American films
2010s French films